Liza Kisteneva (born 17 October 1998) is a Russian chess player who holds the title of Woman FIDE Master (WFM) (2009).

Biography
Liza Kisteneva was a student of Moscow chess school. She played for Russia in European Youth Chess Championships and World Youth Chess Championships in the different age groups and best result reached in 2008 in Herceg Novi, when Liza Kisteneva won European Youth Chess Championship in the U10 girl's age group. In 2012, in Prague she won bronze medal in European Youth Chess Championship in the U14 girl's age group. In 2012, in Jūrmala she won Alexei Shirov's Winter Cup for Girls. In 2020, she came second in Women's Blitz Caplin British Online Chess Championship.

References

External links
Liza Kisteneva chess games at 365chess.com

1998 births
Living people
Russian female chess players
Chess Woman FIDE Masters